Kenneth "Kenny" Gould (born May 11, 1967) was an American boxer, who won the welterweight bronze medal at the 1988 Summer Olympics. He won the world title at the 1986 World Amateur Boxing Championships in Reno, followed by a silver medal at the 1987 Pan American Games.

1988 Olympic Games
Defeated Joseph Marwa (Tanzania) 4–1
Defeated Alfred Ankamah (Ghana) 5–0
Defeated Maselino Masoe (American Samoa) 5–0
Defeated Joni Nyman (Finland) 5–0
Lost to Laurent Boudouani (France) 1–4

Professional career
Gould began his professional career that same year and retired in 1993 with a career record of 26–2 (15KO). He fought limited opposition throughout his career, and was unable to compete at the higher levels of the pro ranks. His most notable foe was undefeated contender Roger Turner, who beat Gould by decision, and later went on to be KO'd by Félix Trinidad in a world title fight.  
Gould went on to win the fringe IBO world title, but was forced to retire due to a shoulder injury.

External links
 
 

1967 births
Living people
Boxers from Illinois
Welterweight boxers
Boxers at the 1987 Pan American Games
Boxers at the 1988 Summer Olympics
Olympic bronze medalists for the United States in boxing
Pan American Games silver medalists for the United States
Sportspeople from Rockford, Illinois
Winners of the United States Championship for amateur boxers
American male boxers
AIBA World Boxing Championships medalists
Medalists at the 1988 Summer Olympics
Pan American Games medalists in boxing
Medalists at the 1987 Pan American Games